Studio 28 was a cinema multiplex located on 28th Street in Wyoming, Michigan, operational from 1965 to 2008. Expanding to a maximum of 20 screens, it was the first megaplex, and was once the largest multi-screen cinema complex in the world. It was opened by cinema pioneer Jack Loeks, and eventually became the flagship of Jack Loeks Theatres, Inc., a.k.a. Celebration Cinemas. It closed due to competition from other cineplexes in the metro area.

History
Studio 28 opened on Christmas Day 1965 with a single 1,000-seat theater. It expanded in 1967, adding a second screen dubbed the "Little Studio", which commonly showed features for children when the big screen was showing a feature for older audiences, or a film with a niche audience while the main screen showed a more commercial feature. The complex expanded to six screens in 1976, enabling it to accommodate extended runs of the popular blockbusters of the era, while still having screens for new releases. It expanded further to twelve screens in 1984, and to twenty in 1988. Loeks ultimately aspired to expand to a total of twenty-eight screens, to match the name of the complex (originally chosen for the street name).

The complex broke a single day attendance record on November 29, 1990, serving 16,000 guests, a record which still remains unbroken. (Home Alone and Dances with Wolves were in their opening weeks at the time.)

Loeks opened several other cinemas in other parts of the metro area, including Celebration Cinema! North and Celebration Cinema! South. The Cinemark chain built new complexes at nearby RiverTown Crossings Mall and Woodland Mall, which oversaturated the market (and would close several years later, re-opened by Loeks). Studio 28 saw a sharp decline in attendance, leading to its eventual closure on November 23, 2008. In March 2014, the building was demolished.

References

Cinemas and movie theaters in Michigan
Former cinemas in the United States
Theatres completed in 1965